WWEB (89.9 FM) was a high school radio station broadcasting a variety music format. Licensed to Wallingford, Connecticut, United States, the station served the New Haven area. The station was last owned by Choate Rosemary Hall Foundation. WWEB featured student and faculty programs supplemented with the programming of WWUH from the University of Hartford.

History
WWEB's initial construction permit was applied for on November 20, 1965, and granted on November 10, 1966. The station was granted the callsign WWEB on February 14, 1967, and its license to cover was granted on April 10, 1968. In the early days, the station was on the third floor north attic of the building called the Science building (now Humanities). They used a Bauer 5-pot slide board. The transmitter was on a cabinet right behind the turntables, made by Granger. The transmitter fed a ” line up to the roof where a 2-bay horizontal V only antenna was mounted on a pole or small tower section.

WWEB was one of the first National Public Radio distribution stations, in 1971, when it operated at a maximum of 10 watts, as a Class D educational station, featuring weekly broadcasts of "Washington Week in Review" and "Firing Line" predating the later PBS television versions.

Its license was cancelled on April 4, 2022 for failing to file a renewal application.

References

External links

 Unofficial WWEB History

Wallingford, Connecticut
WEB
High school radio stations in the United States
Radio stations established in 1968
Radio stations disestablished in 2022
1968 establishments in Connecticut
2022 disestablishments in Connecticut
Defunct radio stations in the United States
WEB